William F. Sullivan (December 1868 – October 8, 1905) was a professional baseball player. He appeared in six games in Major League Baseball for the Syracuse Stars of the American Association in 1890, all as a starting pitcher.

External links

Major League Baseball pitchers
Syracuse Stars (AA) players
Lowell Magicians players
Lowell Chippies players
Lowell (minor league baseball) players
Providence Clamdiggers (baseball) players
Baseball players from Providence, Rhode Island
19th-century baseball players
1868 births
1905 deaths